Tuam railway station is a largely disused railway station in Tuam, County Galway, Ireland.

History
The station was originally opened in 1860 as part of the Waterford, Limerick and Western Railway route between Limerick and Sligo, and was the major stop on the section between Athenry and Claremorris, being the only station on this section with two platforms and a passing loop. In 1901, the WLWR was purchased by the Great Southern and Western Railway, and thus became part of the GSWR's network. Tuam also featured an extensive goods yard and locomotive facilities. The station was closed, along with the whole route, in 1976 during Córas Iompair Éireann's rationalisation of the rail network.

After its closure to passenger trains, the goods facilities at Tuam continued to be heavily used, as the route remained a significant one for freight. The carriage and locomotive sheds were also used by a group called Westrail. This was a railway preservation group that operated trains between Athenry, Tuam and Claremorris until 1993, when Tuam station was closed as a block post.

Railfreight
The line through the station has been used to transport intermodal containers.

Proposals
As part of the Transport 21 plan (published in 2005), the Limerick-Sligo route was to be rebuilt in stages as the Western Railway Corridor. The reopening of the Athenry-Claremorris section was planned in two sections. Due to financial constraints in public finances, both sections were indefinitely postponed — though Irish Rail's Rail Vision 2030 report (published in 2012) recommended that Galway-Tuam be a priority for review if finances become available.

References

Buildings and structures in Tuam
Iarnród Éireann stations in County Galway
Proposed railway stations in the Republic of Ireland
Railway stations opened in 1860
Railway stations closed in 1976